Grayhawk is an unincorporated community and census-designated place in Ste. Genevieve County, Missouri, United States. Its population was 525 as of the 2010 census.

Geography

Demographics

References

Unincorporated communities in Ste. Genevieve County, Missouri
Unincorporated communities in Missouri
Census-designated places in Ste. Genevieve County, Missouri
Census-designated places in Missouri